Raymond Wilding-White (also known as Ray Wilding-White); (9 October 1922 – 24 August 2001) was an American composer of contemporary classical music and electronic music, and a photographer/digital artist.

Biography 

Wilding-White was born in Caterham, Tandridge, Surrey, England, and spent the first five years of his life in England before moving to Saint-Germain-en-Laye, outside Paris, France, where he had his first formal instruction in music at the Conservatoire Camille Saint-Saëns. In 1932 the family moved to Buenos Aires, Argentina, his mother's family home. By 1940 he had moved to Cambridge, Massachusetts, United States.

Family
Wilding-White's father, Charles Dunning White was an American diplomat. Raymond Wilding-White had a number of brothers including Henry, Charles, and Alexander. His wife Glennie was also an accomplished musician, composer and playwright, as was his son Charles.

Education & Work

In 1940, Wilding-White enrolled in the chemical engineering program at the Massachusetts Institute of Technology, but dropped out to assist in the war effort as a civilian. After the war he was accepted at the Juilliard School in New York City, earning his bachelor's degree in piano performance.

Wilding-White earned his master's degree in composition from the New England Conservatory of Music. During this period he also sang in the Chorus pro Musica under Alfred Nash Patterson, and as a countertenor (male alto) in the choir at Church of the Advent in Boston.

While in Boston he worked at the radio station WGBH. He and Nancy Harper won a Peabody Award for their work on The Children's Circle.

Wilding-White left WGBH to pursue his doctorate in composition from Boston University. He was a student of Aaron Copland and Luigi Dallapiccola.

In 1956, Wilding-White married Glennie. By 1962 he had completed his doctorate and was appointed to the Kulas Chair at Case Institute of Technology. He taught in the humanities program and was director of the Case Glee Club as part of his academic duties and was instrumental in promoting contemporary music concerts and multi-media events in Cleveland, Ohio.

In 1967 Case Institute merged with Western Reserve University, and Wilding-White accepted an invitation from DePaul University to design and install an electronic music studio there. Also in 1967, he was awarded the Cleveland Arts Prize in Music.

Wilding-White continued to teach humanities courses at DePaul until retiring in the mid-1980s.

In Chicago he founded the contemporary performing arts ensemble The Loop Group.

Wilding-White created new radio programming at WFMT in Chicago, Illinois. During the Bicentennial year 1976 he recorded the daily series Our American Music. He also recorded a history of music in Chicago, entitled Music Chicago Style, as a complement to the Chicago Historical Society's exhibit, and wrote and presented programming on composers Charles Ives, John Cage, and Arnold Schoenberg.

Wilding-White's creativity was not limited to music and the performing arts, he was also an avid photographer and visual artist, with exhibitions in the gallery of Darkroom Aids, Chicago (1981) and the Brown County Museum (Green Bay, Wisconsin).

Wilding-White composed over 100 works. He was influenced by the work of John Cage. His scores are archived at the Newberry Library in Chicago, and his photographic work will also be kept there.

Death

Wilding-White died at his home in Kewaunee, Wisconsin, of liver failure at the age of 78 in 2001, leaving a huge body of musical and photographic work. His wife Glennie died thirteen years later, January 31, 2014, at the age of 81.

Compositions

Orchestral 
Even Now: variations for Baritone and Orchestra 
Even Now: Chamber Orchestra version 
Concerto for Piano and Orchestra 
Concerto for Violin and Orchestra 
Concertante for Horn, Violin and Strings 
Bandmusic for concert Band (LP Recording) 
Haiku for solo voices and various Instrumental Combinations 
Whatzit No 4 for Orchestra 
The Southern Harmony for Orchestra and Amateur Chorus (Materials traditionally and graphically notated; final layout to be chosen by the conductor) 
Symphony for Swing Orchestra 
De Profundis: The 8 Virtues and 7 Vices as seen by Peter Breughel 
Quodlibet for Chorus, Solo Voices and Orchestra. 4 Mov. 
A Symphony of Symphonies 
Symphony No 1 Old Postcards: String Orchestra 
Symphony No 2 Thomas Cole's "The Voyage of Life": Full Orchestra 
Symphony No 3 Boccioni's "States of Mind": Wind and Percussion Orch.

Choral 
The Psalms 
Psalm 1 Mixed Chorus 
Psalm 2 Three Equal Male Parts 
Psalm 3 SSAA and 3 Trombones 
Psalm 4 SATB 
Psalm 5 (Two Versions) 
Psalm 5 (Monte Carlo Suite No 4): Soprano and Wind Ensemble 
Psalm 6 Female Voices 
Psalm 6 Spoken Ensemble and Drum Set 
Psalm 7 Mixed voices 
Psalm 8 SATB 
Two Psalms for Baritone 
No 16 Solo 
No 126 with piano 
Four Psalms for Tenor and String Quartet 
Psalm 63
Psalm 70
Psalm 42
Psalm 100
Psalm 9 Mixed Voices 
Psalm 11 SATB and flute 
Psalm 12 (The Magic Square) SAB 
Psalm 13 Soprano and Piano (in 12 Songs) 
Three Psalms for Bariton and Percussion 
Psalm 13 
Psalm 93 
Psalm 43 
Psalm 15 Pop setting SAAA, 2 keyboards, bass (opt drum set) 
Psalm 16 Soprano and Organ 
Psalm 17 SATB 
Psalm 18 Mixed Voices and Orchestra 
Psalm 19 "The 702 Names of God" 6 voices, solo voice, 2 electric pianos 
Psalm 19 "Morse Code" 
Four Psalms for Voices and Brass 
No 12 for (amplified) SSAABB Trumpet. Horn and Trombone 
No 111 for SSAATTBB 3 Trumpets. 3 Trombones & Tuba 
No 113 for SATB 3 Trumpets. 3 Trombones & Tuba 
No 115 for SSAATTBB Trumpet, Horn and Trombone 
Psalm 20 Bass and violin 
Psalm 21 Baritone and cello 
Psalm 22 Amplified S and 3 Trumpets 
Psalm 23 (Two Versions) SSAA 
Psalm 24 Bariton and cello 
Psalm 25 2 voices and 4 cymbal players 
Psalm 26 Soprano solo, oboe, string quartet 
Psalm 27 Soprano solo, 6 clarinets 
Psalm 28 SSS soli 
Psalm 29 SATB 
Psalm 30 Teno, solo horn, bassoon 
Psalm 31 Three Voices and 6 Xylophonists (3 instruments) 
Psalm 32 SB, flute, clarinet, horn, violin, viola, cello 
Psalm 33 Soprano solo, violin, cello, 2 trombones, theremin, percussion 
Psalm 39 "Jeux de Cartes" Score on a deck of cards to be shuffled and dealt. 
Variable number of voices and instruments 
Psalm 43 Any number of men in unison and independently; 7 women plus 2 clarinets, 2 percussion & piano 
Psalm 47 Male Chorus 
Psalm 47 jazz vocal quartet setting 
Psalm 51 Soprano solo, English horn, string quartet or organ 
Psalm 54 24 Solo voices 
Psalm 84 Baritone and flute 
Psalm 89 - 6 altos and 6 flutes 
Psalm 95 SSSSAAAATTBB 
Psalm 99 SSAATTBB Organ 
Psalm 102 Soprano, Countertenor and Organ 
Psalm 109 16 Solo Voices 
Psalm 112 Graphic Score 
Psalm 114 Soprano and Piano (in 12 Songs) 
Psalm 134 12 sung voices and 12 spoken voices 
Psalm 141/142 - 4 sopranos, 4 altos, 4 baritones, piano, tam tam, truck spring 
Psalm 142 with Mark Twain's War Prayer 
SATB soli, SATB chorus, 4 oboes, 3 trumpets, 3 tbns, Vi 1-2, Vl, Ce, Bass. 
Psalm 149 for SS Violin and viola 
Psalm 150 for SSTB Hammered Dulcimer and Harpsichord 
Advent Choruses (Various short choruses) 
Penitential Mass 
Latin Mass SATB 
Jazz Mass SATB 
Magnificat S Violin and Viola 
Magnificat for Jazz Vocal Group SATB Soli and SATB 
Easter Music for St Agnes A Solo & Harpsichord 
Space Madrigals (Pub Lawson Gould) 
A Book of Madrigals (52 madrigals for various combinations a capella) 
Wedding Motet: SATB 
Bennington Epitaphs SATB 
The Ship of Death: Mezzo-Soprano, SATB and Wind Ensemble 
Three Christmas Carols 
Three Songs by Sir Thomas Wyatt SSAA 
Restoration Lyrics (Texts by the Earl of Rochester) TTBB 
Mexico City Blues (Kerouac): Male Chorus and Jazz Combo 
Laudamus Viros Gloriosos: Male Chorus 
In Memoriam A.N.R SATB 
The Enrolment Management Rag: Mixed Chorus 
Whatzit No 5 for Chorus 
Nursery Birds for Mixed Chorus 
Tang Poems: 20 settings for various combinations of voice and Instruments 
Requiescat (to a poem by Oscar Wilde)
McGuffey's Eclectic Reader. SATB & 
Small chorus SATB (Optionally SSAATTBB soli) and small ensemble 
A Song for Christmas Eve, words by Glennie Wilding-White

Songs 
Three Housman Poems: S and Piano (Pub Galaxy) 
Six Poems from the Tang Dynasty: S and Flute 
Twelve Songs for Soprano and Piano (1959) (includes 4 William Blake Songs) 

Three Poems by Robert Graves: Bar and Piano
Novalis songs: Bar and Piano
Trionfo di Bacco e Arianne: Two Sopranos and Piano
The Ballad of Psychoanalysis: Contralto and Piano
Cummings Songs Soprano or Mezzo and Piano
Cinco Poemas de Gil Vicente: Soprano and Piano
Eight Songs: Two sopranos and Instrumental Ensemble
Twenty Dickinson Poems: Soprano and Alto
Four Poems by St John of the Cross: Mezzo. Two Flutes and Two Trumpets
Quatre Poemes and Quatre Poemes: Soprano, Flute/Recorder and Piano
For Mrs Crofts: Soprano and flute
For Robert Michaud: Baritone and flute
The Arkansas Traveler: Tenor and Piano
Death Songs: Soprano and Instrumental Ensemble
Millay Poems
a: Nine for Soprano and Piano 
b: Nine for Soprano and guitar 
Three Poems by Sid Corman for Alto. Violin and Viola 
Le Bestiaire ou le Cortege d'Orphee for soprano, flute, cello, harp 
Two Iwi Songs: 
1. Solo voice and 3 equal voices 
2. SSATB soli 
Short Mass for Soprano and Organ 
Two German Songs for Soprano and Piano

Instrumental 
Sonata for Two Pianos 
Piano sonata 
Three organ Preludes 
14 Chorale Preludes for Organ 
Duos for Violin and Piano 
String Quartet No 1 
String Quartet No 2 (Monte Carlo Suite No l) 
String Quartet No 3 (The Forest) Tenor and String Quartet 
String Quartet No 4 
String Quartet No 5 
String Quartet No 6 (The Song Quartet) Soprano and String Quartet 
String Quartet No 7 (See Psalms) 
Variations for Chamber Organ and String Trio 
Character Sketches for Piano (Pub Galaxy) 
For Mallets (Pub Mus for Perc.) 
Sonatina for Trumpet and Piano 
Counterpoints for Two Clarinets 
Fragments for Jazz Ensemble 
Encores for Stu: Solo Trombone 
Fifty Eight Traditional Variations on a Traditional Theme: Piano Brass duets 
Brass duets 
Whatzit No 1 for Perc and Piano 
Whatzit No 2 for Piano 
Whatzit No 3 for Piano 
Whatzit No 6 for Solo Trombone 
The Rape of Spring (from fragments attributed to Roger Scott) 
Harpsichord, Tape and Narration 
Algorhythms for Piano 
Eight Fish Creek Autographs 
Monte Carlo Suite No 3 (*Piano sonata 2) 
Serenata for Brass Quintet 
Whatzit No 12-Short Things for Violin and Piano 
Three Short Rags and The Monotony Rag 
Fanfare for Mark Rothko. Tape and Brass Quintet 
Lines from the Twelve Moons: Narrator. Piano and Four Basses 
Les Fourberies: Suite for Hammered Dulcimer, Guitar and Harpsichord 
Variations on Stabat Mater for Organ 
My Album: Assorted Inventions 
Concerto for Organ and Piano 
Suite for Flute and Marimba 
14 Romantic Preludes from Old Maritime Postcards for Piano Solo

Stage works 
The Tub (chamber opera for SATB soli and Piano) 
The Lonesome Valley (ballet) 
The Selfish Giant (opera for TV) 
The Trees (ballet) 
Yerma (opera in 3 acts, 6 scenes.) 
The Music of Eric Zann -- A Gothic Tale after H.P. Lovecraft (tape and violin) 
Liturgy (ballet, brass quintet) 
Trio (ballad opera) 
Gifts (liturgical drama) 
Gifts II (liturgical drama) 
The Ghost of a Flea (puppet show)

Books 
Wilding-White, Raymond (1994). Music Chicago Style. Kewaunee, Wisconsin: Raymond Wilding-White. OCLC: 47815153.

References

External links 
Obituary
List of works
Obituary
One Way to Run a Railroad: Memories of the First Days of WGBH
Ear to The Earth: John Cage Piece Inspired by Raymond Wilding White
Raymond Wilding-White Papers at the Newberry

1922 births
2001 deaths
20th-century classical composers
English classical composers
English emigrants to the United States
English expatriates in France
English expatriates in Argentina
MIT School of Engineering alumni
Juilliard School alumni
Boston University College of Fine Arts alumni
New England Conservatory alumni
DePaul University faculty
Case Western Reserve University faculty
American digital artists
People from Caterham
People from Kewaunee, Wisconsin
English opera composers
Male opera composers
English male classical composers
20th-century English composers
British digital artists
20th-century English male musicians